"Life after love" is a lyric in Cher's 1998 song "Believe".

Life After Love may also refer to:

 Life After Love (film), a 2000 romantic comedy
 Life After Love, a pair of extended plays by Victoria Monét

See also
 "Is There Life After Love?", song on The Woman in Me (album)